Konstantin Ivanovich Konstantinov (6 Аpril 1818 – 12 January 1871) was a Russian artillery officer and scientist in the fields of artillery, rocketry and instrument making. He completed his military career at the rank of Lieutenant General.

Life 
He was an illegitimate son of Grand Duke Constantine Pavlovich of Russia and a French actress. 

Konstantinov graduated from Mikhailovskoye Artillery School in St. Petersburg in 1836. In 1844, he invented a device for measuring the flight speed of projectiles at any point of their trajectory. In 1847 Konstantinov created a ballistic rocket pendulum, which would allow to establish a law of changing rocket motion in time. With the help of this device, he was able to determine the influence of the form and design of a rocket on its ballistic characteristics, thereby laying the foundations for calculated rocket designs. In 1849 he was appointed commander of the Petersburg Rocketry Department (Петербургское ракетное заведение). In 1861, he supervised the construction of a rocket factory in Nikolayev, which he would head six years later.  

Konstantinov is known to have created structurally perfect missiles (for the 19th century) with a range of 4 to 5 km, launch pads, and rocket-making machines. He authored a number of works on rocket science, artillery, firearms, pyrotechnics, and aeronautics. A crater on the far side of the Moon is named after him.

See also 
 List of Russian inventors

External links 
Biography of Konstantinov 

Konstantinov, Konstantin
Konstantinov, Konstantin
Konstantinov, Konstantin
Konstantinov, Konstantin
Konstantinov, Konstantin
19th-century people from the Russian Empire